Educational Research Analysts is an organization based in Longview, Texas, United States, founded by Mel and Norma Gabler to monitor public school textbooks. The organization reviews books to locate factual errors and to promote a conservative Christian point of view, offering preference to textbooks which, for example, promote sexual abstinence rather than contraception and firearms safety rather than gun control. They launched the organization in 1961 from their kitchen table in tiny Hawkins in Wood County in east Texas, after having begun to review textbooks assigned to their son. Many of the books that the Gablers have given high ratings have been adopted by the Texas State Textbook Committee. If a school district wishes textbooks with other viewpoints than those approved by the state committee, it must fund such materials from its own resources.

Criticism 
Progressives, teachers, professors, parents, and civil libertarians have alleged that the Gablers promoted their fundamentalist views in the textbook selection process. They have pointed out that the Gablers did not have college degrees, yet assumed the role of textbook monitors and claimed editorial authority over textbook authors. Many criticized the State Board of Education for giving the Gablers undue influence.  The Texas State Board of Education wields enormous influence upon the choice of textbooks used across America, because Texas, as a large and populous state, requires many textbooks, and both publishers and smaller states can save much-needed operating costs or education funds by simply using the Texas version of a given text.

See also
Creation–evolution controversy

References

External links
Educational Research Analysts
Censorship of Evolution in Texas
Mel Gabler, RIP

Textbook controversies
Educational organizations based in the United States
Organizations established in 1961
Organizations based in Texas
1961 establishments in Texas
Conservative organizations in the United States
Education controversies in the United States